The Fond du Lac River is a river that flows through the city of Fond du Lac, Wisconsin into Lake Winnebago. The river starts near Rosendale, Lamartine and Eldorado, then flows around 10 miles east. The east and west branches come together in downtown Fond du Lac less than a mile before flowing into Lake Winnebago.

The Supple Marsh and Lakeside Park border the river as it flows into Lake Winnebago.

2019 Flooding
On March 13 and 14, the river flooded its banks in downtown Fond du Lac. The flooding was a result of ice jams under the main bridges that cross the river in the city. Evacuation efforts were put in place, as crews worked to remove the ice. Multiple state and local groups helped with the recovery.

See also
List of Wisconsin rivers

References

Rivers of Fond du Lac County, Wisconsin
Rivers of Wisconsin